Grisuela del Páramo is a village belonging to the Bustillo del Páramo municipality, province of León, Castile and León, Spain. According to the 2009 census (INE), it has a population of 175 inhabitants.

The Church of Grisuela del Páramo is an outstanding building listed as Bien de Interés Cultural, "Property of special Cultural Interest", in Spain.

Gallery

Municipalities in the Province of León
Bien de Interés Cultural landmarks in the Province of León